Oak Furnitureland is a British furniture retailer specialising in fully assembled hardwood cabinet and dining furniture, and sofa ranges. The company has stores across the UK, with its headquarters located in Swindon in Wiltshire, England.

History
Oak Furnitureland was launched through its website on Boxing Day, 2006. The company started in 2003 by selling on eBay. It opened a pop-up shop on an airfield in the Cotswolds. Its first store on a retail park was in Chippenham. The company reported a turnover of £85m and a profit of £9.2m in the year to September 30, 2012.

In late 2012, the business moved its national distribution centre to a 302,000 sq ft building in South Marston near Swindon, Wiltshire.

A new Christmas TV advert  was launched in 2012, promoting their dining set offering, with the overall theme being "Don't Do This To Nan".

For their Winter Sale 2013 TV advert campaign, the characters of Oak and Acorn were introduced. Oak, played by Stephen Critchlow, was the mature salesman while Acorn, played by Philip Labey, was the comedy relief within this duo.

In an interview with The Sunday Times on 10 January 2015, the firm's then managing director stated that his chain has sales of £194m.

In June 2015, Oak Furnitureland became the principal sponsor and home kit sponsor for association football club Burnley. They ceded their shirt sponsorship space at the Burnley versus Leeds United fixture on 9 April 2016, in place of Burnley FC in the Community — the club's official charity.

In June 2020, Davidson Kempner Capital Management bought Oak Furnitureland out of administration.

References

External links
Official website

Furniture retailers of the United Kingdom
Retail companies established in 2006
Online retailers of the United Kingdom